Kevin Wayne Jordan (born October 9, 1969), is a retired American Australian Major League Baseball infielder who played for the Philadelphia Phillies from 1995 to 2001. He also played a substantial part of his career with the Brisbane Bandits in the Australian Baseball League from 1993 through to 1997.

Jordan managed the Brisbane Bandits in the Australian Baseball League.

In January 2018, it was announced that Jordan would be serving as a part-time color analyst for Phillies radio broadcasts during the 2018 season.

References

External links

1969 births
Nebraska Cornhuskers baseball players
Major League Baseball infielders
Baseball players from California
Philadelphia Phillies players
Prince William Cannons players
Fort Lauderdale Yankees players
Oneonta Yankees players
Louisville Bats players
Fresno Grizzlies players
Toledo Mud Hens players
Scranton/Wilkes-Barre Red Barons players
Cañada Colts baseball players
Camden Riversharks players
Albany-Colonie Yankees players
Major League Baseball broadcasters
Philadelphia Phillies announcers
Living people
American expatriate baseball players in Australia
Anchorage Bucs players
Lowell High School (San Francisco) alumni